Erland Van Lidth De Jeude (1953–1987) was a Dutch-American actor, opera singer, and amateur wrestler
 Flip van Lidth de Jeude (born 1949), Dutch field hockey player
 Marc Liénart van Lidth de Jeude (1950–2019), known professionally as Art Sullivan, Belgian singer
 Otto van Lidth de Jeude (1881–1952), Dutch politician
 Theodoor Gerard van Lidth de Jeude (1788–1863), Dutch physician, veterinarian, and zoologist, grandfather of Theodorus
 Theodorus Willem van Lidth de Jeude (1853–1937), Dutch zoologist and herpetologist, grandson of Theodoor.